Penicillin is a group of antibiotic medicines.

Penicillin may also refer to:

 Penicillin (band), a Japanese visual kei/alternative rock band
 Penicillin (cocktail), a cocktail based on whiskey, ginger, and lemon
 Penicillin (counter-artillery system), a Russian military sensor system